The 2017 Global MX-5 Cup was the twelfth season of the Mazda MX-5 Cup since the series inception in 2006. It was the second season since the series re-branding as the Global MX-5 Cup, as well as the first under INDYCAR sanctioning.

Calendar

Race calendar and results

References

Global MX-5 Cup